Franklin Thomas may refer to:
Franklin A. Thomas (born 1934), president of the Ford Foundation, 1979–1996
Franklin and David Thomas (both died 1995), convicted murderers who were executed by Saint Vincent and the Grenadines

See also
Frank Thomas (disambiguation)